Genevieve Delves (born 21 September 1978) is an Australian international lawn and indoor bowler.

Bowls career
In 2019, she won the Australian National indoor title, which qualified her to represent Australia at the 2022 World Bowls Indoor Championships. The delay in representing Australia at the event was due to cancellations in 2020 and 2021 because of the COVID-19 pandemic

References

Australian female bowls players
1978 births
Living people